Were is an archaic term for an adult male human, now used as a prefix to indicate a type of shapeshifter. Were may also refer to:

 were, a preterite and irrealis form of the English copular verb to be
 Were music, a style of Muslim religious music
 WERE, a radio station licensed to Cleveland Heights, Ohio, United States
 Boky Wéré, a village in Mali
 Were (river), a river in Wiltshire, England
 Were language, a language of Papua New-Guinea
 Wèré, a variety of the Upper Morehead language of Papua New-Guinea
 Were or Warra, a common element in the names of Oromo clans of Ethiopia
Were (surname)

See also 
 
 We're
 Where (disambiguation)
 Wear (disambiguation)
 Ware (disambiguation)